
Gmina Maszewo is an urban-rural gmina (administrative district) in Goleniów County, West Pomeranian Voivodeship, in north-western Poland.

Villages
Apart from the town of Maszewo, Gmina Maszewo contains the villages and settlements of Bagna, Bęczno, Bielice, Budzieszowce, Dąbrowica, Darż, Dębice, Dobrosławiec, Dolacino, Godowo, Jarosławki, Jenikowo, Kłodniki, Kolonia Maszewo, Korytowo, Leszczynka, Maciejewo, Maszewko, Mieszkowo, Mokre, Nastazin, Pogrzymie, Przemocze, Radzanek, Rożnowo Nowogardzkie, Sokolniki, Stodólska, Swojcino, Tarnowo, Wałkno, Wisławie and Zagórce.

Neighbouring gminas
Gmina Maszewo is bordered by the gminas of Chociwel, Dobra, Goleniów, Nowogard, Osina, Stara Dąbrowa and Stargard.

References
Polish official population figures 2006

External links 
Gmina Maszewo, West Pomerania

Maszewo
Gmina Maszewo